Shock Front is the first full length album by Converter, released November 22, 1999 (see 1999 in music). The album is released in two editions, the first featuring a special metal plate packaging (now deleted), the second featuring a regular cardboard booklet format (still available).

Track listing
 "Conqueror"–8:05
 "Shock Front"–7:15
 "Cannibals"–5:00
 "Spirit Shield"–6:24
 "Coma"–6:12
 "Sacrifice"–8:13
 "Memory-Trace"–9:23
 "Deadman (Perdition)"–4:38
 "Denogginizer"–11:40
 "Sadist"–3:19

Credits
 Scott Sturgis – Production

References

1999 albums